Rusksele is a locality situated in Lycksele Municipality, Västerbotten County, Sweden with 200 inhabitants in 2010.

References 

Populated places in Västerbotten County
Populated places in Lycksele Municipality